Marty Lyons (born 4 September 1956) is a former Australian rules footballer who played with Melbourne in the Victorian Football League (VFL).

His son, Jarryd made his debut for Adelaide in 2011 and was traded to the Gold Coast in 2017. His other son Corey was drafted to Brisbane Lions during the 2016 AFL Draft.

Notes

External links 

1956 births
Living people
Australian rules footballers from Victoria (Australia)
Melbourne Football Club players
Sandringham Football Club players